Elections to Newtownabbey Borough Council were held on 7 June 2001 on the same day as the other Northern Irish local government elections. The election used four district electoral areas to elect a total of 25 councillors.

Election results

Note: "Votes" are the first preference votes.

Districts summary

|- class="unsortable" align="centre"
!rowspan=2 align="left"|Ward
! % 
!Cllrs
! % 
!Cllrs
! %
!Cllrs
! %
!Cllrs
! % 
!Cllrs
! %
!Cllrs
!rowspan=2|TotalCllrs
|- class="unsortable" align="center"
!colspan=2 bgcolor="" | UUP
!colspan=2 bgcolor="" | DUP
!colspan=2 bgcolor="" | SDLP
!colspan=2 bgcolor="" | Alliance
!colspan=2 bgcolor="" | Sinn Féin
!colspan=2 bgcolor="white"| Others
|-
|align="left"|Antrim Line
|bgcolor="#40BFF5"|27.2
|bgcolor="#40BFF5"|2
|22.2
|2
|19.2
|2
|13.4
|1
|5.2
|0
|12.8
|0
|7
|-
|align="left"|Ballyclare
|bgcolor="#40BFF5"|42.8
|bgcolor="#40BFF5"|3
|38.3
|2
|0.0
|0
|10.1
|0
|0.0
|0
|8.8
|0
|5
|-
|align="left"|Macedon
|11.2
|1
|27.3
|2
|0.0
|0
|2.4
|0
|5.0
|0
|bgcolor="#DDDDDD"|54.1
|bgcolor="#DDDDDD"|3
|6
|-
|align="left"|University
|bgcolor="#40BFF5"|33.6
|bgcolor="#40BFF5"|3
|22.7
|2
|0.0
|0
|13.1
|1
|0.0
|0
|30.6
|1
|7
|-
|- class="unsortable" class="sortbottom" style="background:#C9C9C9"
|align="left"| Total
|29.2
|9
|26.8
|8
|5.7
|2
|8.0
|1
|5.0
|1
|25.3
|4
|25
|-
|}

Districts results

Antrim Line

1997: 3 x UUP, 1 x SDLP, 1 x Alliance, 1 x DUP, 1 x Newtownabbey Ratepayers
2001: 2 x DUP, 2 x UUP, 2 x SDLP, 1 x Sinn Féin
1997-2001 Change: DUP, SDLP and Sinn Féin gain from UUP, Alliance and Newtownabbey Ratepayers

Ballyclare

1997: 3 x UUP, 1 x DUP, 1 x Alliance
2001: 3 x UUP, 2 x DUP
1997-2001 Change: DUP gain from Alliance

Macedon

1997: 2 x Newtownabbey Labour, 1 x UUP, 1 x UDP, 1 x Newtownabbey Ratepayers, 1 x Independent Unionist
2001: 2 x DUP, 2 x Independent, 1 x UUP, 1 x Newtownabbey Ratepayers
1997-2001 Change: DUP (two seats) gain from Newtownabbey Labour and Independent Unionist, Newtownabbey Labour and UDP become Independent

University

1997: 3 x UUP, 2 x Independent Unionist, 1 x Alliance, 1 x PUP
2001: 3 x UUP, 2 x DUP, 1 x Alliance, 1 x United Unionist
1997-2001 Change: DUP (two seats) gain from PUP and Independent Unionist, Independent Unionist joins United Unionist

References

Newtownabbey Borough Council elections
Newtownabbey